Sir Matthew Bloxam (1744 – 16 October 1822), of Highgate, Middlesex, was a British businessman and politician.

He was born the eldest son of the Rev. Matthew Bloxam, vicar of Comberton, Worcestershire. He became a partner in the firm of Foudrinier, Bloxam and Walker, wholesale stationers of Lombard Street, London and in the bank of Sanderson, Harrison, Brenchley, Bloxam and Co. of Southwark. He was elected Sheriff of London for 1787-8 and served as an alderman from 1803 to 1821.

He was a Member (MP) of the Parliament of Great Britain for Maidstone 1788 to 1806.

He was knighted in 1800.

References

1744 births
1822 deaths
People from Highgate
British bankers
Members of the Parliament of Great Britain for English constituencies
British MPs 1784–1790
British MPs 1790–1796
British MPs 1796–1800
Members of the Parliament of the United Kingdom for English constituencies
UK MPs 1801–1802
UK MPs 1802–1806
Sheriffs of the City of London